The RSM-56 Bulava (lit. "mace", NATO reporting name SS-NX-30 or SS-N-32, GRAU index 3M30, 3K30) is a submarine-launched ballistic missile (SLBM) developed for the Russian Navy and deployed in 2013 on the new  of ballistic missile nuclear submarines. It is intended as the future cornerstone of Russia's nuclear triad, and is the most expensive weapons project in the country.  The weapon takes its name from bulava, a Russian word for mace.

Designed by Moscow Institute of Thermal Technology, development of the missile was launched in the late 1990s as a replacement for the R-39 Rif solid-fuel SLBM. The Project 955/955A Borei-class submarines carry 16 missiles per vessel. Development and deployment of the Bulava missile within the Russian Navy is not affected by the enforcement of the new START treaty.

A source in the Russian defense industry told TASS on June 29, 2018, that the D-30 missile system with the R-30 Bulava intercontinental ballistic missile had been accepted for service in the Russian Navy after its successful four-missile salvo launch tests in 2018.

Description

The Bulava missile was developed by Moscow Institute of Thermal Technology under the leadership of chief designer Yury Solomonov. Although it utilizes some engineering solutions used for the recent RT-2PM2 Topol-M ICBM, the new missile has been developed virtually from scratch. The Bulava is the submarine version of the Topol-M, and is both lighter and thinner than the Volna. The two missiles are expected to have comparable ranges, and similar CEP and warhead configurations.  Bulava has a declared START throw weight of 1150 kg to 9,500 kilometers.

The missile has three stages; the first and second stages use solid fuel propellant, while the third stage uses a liquid fuel to allow high maneuverability during warhead separation. The missile can be launched from an inclined position, allowing a submarine to fire them while moving. It has a low flight trajectory, and due to this could be classified as a quasi-ballistic missile. It is rumored to possess advanced missile defense evasion capabilities and can maneuver at its boost stage.

Borei-class submarines carrying Bulava missiles are expected to be an integral part of the Russian nuclear triad until 2040.

Bulava can be loaded on TEL road mobile launchers, on railway BZhRK trains and other various launchers.

Development history

Inception
In the 1990s, Russia had two submarine-launched ICBMs, the solid-fuel R-39 and the liquid-fuel R-29 Vysota family, both developed by the Makeyev Design Bureau. A new missile, designated R-39UTTH Bark was under development to replace the R-39. The Bark was planned to become the only submarine-launched ballistic missile of the Russian nuclear arsenal. However, its development was plagued with problems, and after three test failures the Bark programme was canceled in 1998. Moscow Institute of Thermal Technology was now tasked with developing a new advanced missile. The institute promised that it would able to quickly develop a new naval missile based on its recent Topol-M land-based ICBM.

The new missile would be deployed per 16 missiles on the Borei I (Project 955) and Borei II (Project 955A) class submarines. As the new submarines would not be ready in time for flight tests, the Typhoon-class submarine Dmitry Donskoy was upgraded to carry Bulavas.

Key people involved in the decision to develop Bulava included the institute director and Bulava's chief designer Yury Solomonov; director of the Defense Ministry's Fourth Central Research Institute, Major-General Vladimir Dvorkin; Navy Commander, Fleet Admiral Vladimir Kuroyedov; Defense Minister, Marshal Igor Sergeyev; Economics Minister Yakov Urinson and Prime Minister Viktor Chernomyrdin.

First tests
The missile completed the first stage launch-tests at the end of 2004. Although it was initially planned to base the Bulava design on the Topol-M, the first tests showed that the new missile was completely different in terms of appearance, dimensions and warhead lay-out. It was later acknowledged that the Moscow Institute of Thermal Technology had developed Bulava virtually from scratch, reusing only a few engineering solutions from the Topol-M.

Troubles
The missile's flight test programme was problematic. Until 2009, there were 6 failures in 13 flight tests and one failure during ground test, blamed mostly on substandard components. This led to the missile's chief designer, Yury Solomonov resigning from his post in July 2009. Aleksandr Sukhodolskiy was appointed as the new general designer of sea-based ballistic missiles at the Moscow Institute of Thermal Technology; Solomonov however retained his post of general designer of land-based missiles.

After a failure in December 2009, further tests were put on hold and a probe was conducted to find out the reasons for the failures. Seven launches have been conducted since the probe, all successful. On 28 June 2011, the missile was launched for the first time from its standard carrier, Borei-class submarine , and on 27 August 2011 the first full-range (over ) flight test was conducted. After this successful launch, the start of serial production of Bulava missiles in the same configuration was announced on 28 June 2011. A successful salvo launch on 23 December 2011 concluded the flight test programme. The missile was officially approved for service on 27 December 2011, and was reported to be commissioned aboard Yuri Dolgorukiy on 10 January 2013. The missile did however continue to fail in the summer of 2013 and was not operational as of November 2013. The Bulava became operational aboard Yury Dolgorukiy as of October 2015. However, recent developments put this in question. In November 2015, the submarine  fired two missiles while submerged. One of the missiles self-destructed during the boost phase and the other failed to deliver its warheads to the specified target. After being sent back to the manufacturer, it was determined that the missiles failed due to manufacturing defects.

After two successful tests in June 2017 and May 2018, a source in the Russian defense industry told TASS on June 29, 2018, that the D-30 missile system with the R-30 Bulava intercontinental ballistic missile had been accepted for service in the Russian Navy.

Explanations for the failures
Chief designer Solomonov blamed the failures on the poor state of the Russian defense industry and problems in the design-technology-production chain.
"Sometimes [the problem] is poor-quality materials, sometimes it is the lack of necessary equipment to exclude the 'human' factor in production, sometimes it is inefficient quality control"
According to Solomonov, the industry is unable to manufacture 50 of the necessary components for the missile, forcing designers to improvise and look for alternative solutions, which seriously complicates the testing process. Solomonov further said that despite the failures, there was no need for changes in the design.

Sergei Kovalyov, the designer of three generations of Russian strategic submarines said that due to lack of funding, the developers had been unable to conduct test launches from a floating pad to test the underwater segment of the missile's trajectory. He also said that there were insufficient funds to conduct ground-based test launches. Both types of testing had been standard procedure during Soviet times. Kovalyov also criticised the poor quality of missile components provided by a large number of sub-contractors and the absence of military representatives at manufacturing plants.

The 2009 Norwegian spiral anomalies, a temporary strange light phenomenon over vast areas of northern Norway have been explained with a failed stage of a Bulava missile test. 
According to a spokesman, "The missile's first two stages worked as normal, but there was a technical malfunction at the next, third, stage of the trajectory".

Effects on the military
Due to the delays in Bulava's development, the launch of the fourth Borei-class submarine, Svyatitel Nikolay, was pushed back. Russia was planning to build eight Borei-class submarines by 2015.

Only one Typhoon-class submarine, Dmitry Donskoy, was modified to launch Bulavas. The Bulava program is the most expensive weapons project in Russia.

Debate about the program
Despite continued test failures, the Russian defense minister, Anatoliy Serdyukov, has stated that the project will not be abandoned. "We will certainly not give up the Bulava. I think that despite all the failures, the missile will fly," he said in an interview in late December 2009. The Russian military has been adamant that there is no alternative to Bulava.

There has been discussions among analysts about the possibility of re-equipping the Borei-class submarines with the more reliable liquid-propellant R-29RMU Sineva missiles. The Sineva is an upgrade of the R-29RM Shtil and entered service in 2007. According to RIA Novosti military analyst Ilya Kramnik, this would have been an attractive option, given that the less advanced Sineva missiles already have "virtually the same impressive specifications as the Trident II (D5) SLBMs wielded by the U.S. Navy and the Royal Navy." However, the work needed to redesign and modify the Borei-class submarines to carry Sinevas is regarded as too expensive.

Probe
After a launch failure in December 2009 caused by a defective engine nozzle and which led to the 2009 Norwegian spiral anomaly, further tests were put on hold and a review of the missile program was initiated. The results of the probe were delivered to the Russian government in May 2010.

2010 tests
Testing was resumed for the first time after the probe on 7 October 2010. The missile was launched from the submerged Dmitry Donskoy, in the White Sea, and the warheads successfully hit their targets at the Kura testing range,  to the north of Petropavlovsk-Kamchatsky in the Russian Far East. The launch reportedly took place at 07:15 UTC.

The second test launch in 2010 from Dmitry Donskoy was set to 29 October and was successful.

The next test to be performed from Yuriy Dolgorukiy was initially planned to December 2010, but was postponed to mid-summer 2011 due to ice conditions in White Sea.

2011 tests and deployment
According to the Russian Vice Premier Sergei Ivanov another six successful launches (one planned in 2010, other five in 2011) will be required before the missile could be commissioned.

2012 tests and deployment

In August 2012 a high-ranking official of Russia's United Shipbuilding Corporation said in 2012 Russia will test fire its Bulava missile only once, in November, specifically from the nuclear-powered submarine .

2013 deployment

Bulava was finally commissioned with its lead carrier Yuri Dolgorukiy on 10 January 2013. The official ceremony of raising the Russian Navy colors on the submarine was led by Russian Defense Minister Sergey Shoigu. After another failed launch in September, Shoigu announced a pause in the state trials of the next two submarines and five more test launches. The entire production run of the missiles was then recalled for factory inspections.
Russian Deputy Defense Minister Yury Borisov told reporters on Wednesday 20 November 2013:
"The commission has completed its work. The causes have been determined. They are technological and are related to the production of the nozzle," Borisov told a roundtable meeting on state defense contracts.
The cause of the failure does not call into question "the correctness of the production of the product in general," he said. The flaw that has been revealed has been corrected on the three remaining missiles in this batch, Borisov said. Borisov said Russian Defense Minister Sergei Shoigu has made a decision to hold another five Bulava launches.
"These launches will be planned next year," Borisov said.
The intercontinental ballistic missile Bulava was launched at the Kura testing ground in Kamchatka during the state testing of the strategic nuclear submarine Alexander Nevsky in the White Sea on September 6.
"The missile left the launch container, but its board system failed three minutes into the launch," the Russian Defense Ministry earlier said.

Timetable

Service
In October 2010 it was reported that 150-170 operational missiles would be built (124 active + reserve for training and tests). After the successful launch on 27 June 2011, the Russian government announced the start of serial production of Bulava missiles. On 10 January 2013, Bulava was adopted into experimental service with its lead carrier submarine Yuri Dolgorukiy. It was reported in June 2018 that the missile has been accepted for service by the Russian Navy after its successful test firings conducted in 2018.

Operators
 
 The Russian Navy is the only operator of the RSM-56 Bulava. As of January 2023, 96 missiles were deployed on 6 Borei-class ballistic missile submarines:
 K-535 
 K-550 
 K-551 
 K-549 
 K-552 
 K-553

Specifications

See also
 R-29 Vysota
 R-29RM Shtil
 R-29RMU Sineva
 R-29RMU2 Layner
 Kanyon
 UGM-133 Trident II
 M45 (missile)
 M51 (missile)
 JL-1
 JL-2
 JL-3
 K Missile family
 Pukkuksong-1
 R-39 Rif
 R-39M

References

External links

CSIS Missile Threat - SS-N-32 "Bulava" 
Russia's Bulava undergoes fast-track test programme, May 2006.
Technical data in PDF, DTIG.
Technical data from CNews.ru.
Technical data from warfare.ru.

Nuclear weapons of Russia
Submarine-launched ballistic missiles of Russia
Intercontinental ballistic missiles of Russia
Votkinsk Machine Building Plant products
MIRV capable missiles
Military equipment introduced in the 2010s